This is a list of Central Washington Wildcats players in the NFL Draft.

Key

Selections

References

Lists of National Football League draftees by college football team

Central Washington Wildcats NFL Draft